Botaniska Notiser was a Swedish scientific periodical concerning botany, issued in Lund, by Societate botanica Lundensi or [Lunds Botaniska Förening]. It was published from 1839 to 1980, when it fused with Botanisk Tidsskrift, Friesia and Norwegian Journal of Botany to form the Nordic Journal of Botany. In 2001, the journal reappeared as a regional journal for botany in south Sweden.

Monographs were published in a parallel series, Botaniska Notiser Supplement (1947-1954). This series was fused in 1980 with Dansk Botanisk Arkiv under the name Opera Botanica, which since then has been the monograph series of the Nordic Journal of Botany.

Editors
1900-1921 C. F. O. Nordstedt
1922-1928 Harald Kylin
1929-1937 Nils Sylvén
1938-1949 Henning Weimarck
1950-1953 H. Hjelmqvist
1954-1955 Tycho Norlindh
1956-1957 Henning Weimarck
1958-1964 H. Hjelmqvist
1965-1966 Bertil Nordenstam
1967-1968 Rolf Dahlgren
1969-1970 Ingemar Björkqvist and Hans Runemark
1971-1972 Arne Strid
1972-1975 Gunnar Weimarck
1976-1979 Thomas Karlsson
2001– Kjell-Arne Olsson

References

Publications established in 1839
Botany journals